Line 7 is a loop line of the Chengdu Metro. It loops between North railway station,  Chengdu University of Technology, Huaishudian, Chengdu East railway station, Sichuan Normal University, Chengdu South railway station, Taipingyuan, Jinsha Museum, Southwest Jiaotong University, and City North Coach Terminal Center. Line 7's color is light blue. The construction of Line 7 began in 2013, and ended in late 2017. According to the Chengdu Metro masterplan it will become the inner circle line, with Line 9 being the outer circle line.

Opening timeline

Stations

Listed from the inner Loop

See also

 Urban rail transit in China

References

Chengdu Metro lines
Railway loop lines
Railway lines opened in 2017